Stephen Henry Wendover (July 28, 1831 – March 16, 1889) was an American politician from New York. He was a member of the New York State Senate from 1878 to 1881.

Biography
Stephen Henry Wendover was born in July 1831 in Stuyvesant, New York, to John Thompson Wendover (1800–1875) and Cynthia A. Van Slyck. His brother was Isaac Hutton Wendover (1833–1855).

Wendover attended the common schools and Kinderhook Academy. Following completion of his education, Wendover went to work in the commission and forwarding business, and later in farming. In 1853, he began to work at the National Union Bank of Kinderhook. On January 4, 1865, during the American Civil War, he was appointed to a committee to recruit men from Stuyvesant, New York.

By 1878 Wendover was a director of the National Union Bank of Kinderhook. Wendover was elected President of the bank in January 1879, to succeed William H. Tobey who had died in May 1878, and remained on this post until his own death. On May 13, 1880 a fire swept through the village of Stuyvesant; the destroyed properties included a residence owned by Wendover.

Wendover never married and he died on March 16, 1889, in Stuyvesant, New York, of Bright's disease. He was buried at the Mountain Home Cemetery in Kalamazoo, Michigan.

Political career

Wendover was initially a member of the Whig Party but later joined the Republican Party when it was formed.

Wendover was a member of the New York State Assembly (Columbia Co., 2nd D.) in 1867 and 1868. He won his first election in November 1866 with a majority of 72. In 1867 he served on the committee of commerce and navigation as it investigated complaints about the ferry companies operating in the East River and North River of New York City. In 1868, he served on the Assembly Committee on Trade and Manufactures.

He was elected to the New York State Senate in 1877 with a majority of 1,684 over the Democratic candidate, Charles Wheaton. He was a member of the Senate from 1878 to 1881, sitting in the 101st, 102nd (both 11th D.), 103rd and 104th New York State Legislatures (both 15th D.). In 1878, he was appointed to the Senate committees on Railroads, Insurance, Banks and Grievances.

Footnotes

Additional sources
 Civil List and Constitutional History of the Colony and State of New York compiled by Edgar Albert Werner (1884; pg. 290 and 368f)

External links

1831 births
1889 deaths
Republican Party New York (state) state senators
People from Stuyvesant, New York
Republican Party members of the New York State Assembly
Deaths from kidney disease
19th-century American politicians